Luis Enrique Palma Oseguera (born 17 January 2000) is a Honduran professional footballer who plays as a winger or midfielder for Super League Greece club Aris and the Honduras national team.

Club career

Vida
Palma made his professional and Liga Nacional debut for Vida on 10 September 2017. He scored the third goal in an eventual 5–3 home victory against Honduras Progreso.

On 12 February 2019, Palma joined USL Championship side Real Monarchs on loan. He made his debut the following 9 March as a starter in a 1–1 draw against Sacramento Republic FC. On 27 July, Palma scored his first goal for Monarchs, the lone goal in a 3–1 away loss against San Antonio FC.

Aris
After being linked with Portuguese club Braga and Spanish club Levante, Palma signed with Greek club Aris on a four and a half-year contract on 19 January 2022. He made his debut on the following 14 February in a 2–0 away loss to PAS Giannina in the league. He scored his first goal on 10 April in a 2–1 away victory against AEK Athens. He scored his second goal the following month, once again against AEK Athens, this time in a 3–2 home win.

On 21 July 2022, Palma made his European debut in the qualifying rounds of the UEFA Europa Conference League. He started in the first leg 5–1 home victory against Gomel in the second round. He scored scored one goal and assisted two more. Palma played a further 3 games in the Conference League until Aris was eliminated by Maccabi Tel Aviv.

On 8 November 2022, Palma scored his first career hat-trick in a 5–0 home win against Lamia.

International career
Palma has represented Honduras at under-17 and under-20 level, appearing at the 2017 FIFA U-17 World Cup and the 2019 FIFA U-20 World Cup.

On 7 March 2021, Palma was selected for the squad of the Honduras U-23 team to participate in the Olympic Qualifying Championship. He scored the winning goal in Honduras' 2–1 semifinal win over the United States, after capitalizing on a mistake from David Ochoa, thus ensuring qualification to the 2020 Summer Olympics in Japan. Palma was later selected for the squad to participate in the football tournament at the Olympic Games. Palma came off the bench in Honduras' opener, a 1–0 defeat to Romania. In the next group stage game he would score in an eventual 3–2 win over New Zealand. He would come off the bench in the final group stage game, a 6–0 loss to South Korea.

He made his debut for the senior national team on 7 October 2021 in a World Cup qualifier against Costa Rica, replacing Rigoberto Rivas in the second-half.

Career statistics

Honours
Real Monarchs
USL Championship: 2019

Individual
 CONCACAF Men's Olympic Qualifying Championship Best XI: 2020
 Super League Greece Player of the Month: November 2022

References

External links
Luis Palma at Soccerway
Aris Thessaloniki profile
Real Salt Lake profile
USL Championship profile

2000 births
Living people
People from La Ceiba
Association football midfielders
Honduran footballers
Honduras youth international footballers
Honduras under-20 international footballers
Honduras international footballers
C.D.S. Vida players
Real Monarchs players
Aris Thessaloniki F.C. players
Liga Nacional de Fútbol Profesional de Honduras players
USL Championship players
Super League Greece players
Honduran expatriate footballers
Expatriate soccer players in the United States
Expatriate footballers in Greece
Honduran expatriate sportspeople in the United States
Honduran expatriate sportspeople in Greece
Footballers at the 2020 Summer Olympics
Olympic footballers of Honduras